Leonard Lee Thomas (born August 31, 1961) is an American film and television actor. He is perhaps best known for his role as Big Brother ADP General Patton in Spike Lee's film School Daze.

Early life 
Thomas was born in Muskogee, Oklahoma. He earned a Bachelor of Fine Arts degree from Howard University in 1983.

Career 
Since the beginning of his acting career beginning with School Daze, Thomas has appeared in over twenty movies, often in a minor role alongside Samuel L. Jackson, and is frequently credited as his assistant. In particular, his most notable film roles are in Spike Lee movies including School Daze, Do the Right Thing, Mo' Better Blues, and Malcolm X. He also starred other movies such as Bad Lieutenant and Black Snake Moan and TV shows like Gemini Division and Law & Order.

Personal life 
In 1990, Thomas married actress Iris Little, who is best known for her role as Judge Barbara Lansky in the drama show Law & Order. Together they have two children.

Filmography

Film1

Television

References

External links
 
 

1961 births
Living people
African-American male actors
American male film actors
American male television actors
People from Muskogee, Oklahoma
Male actors from Oklahoma
21st-century African-American people
20th-century African-American people